Outstanding Records is a record company based in London, England, which also manages many of the bands on the label.

Roster
 The Pinker Tones
 David Devant & His Spirit Wife
 Veldt
 Mr Solo
 Ovni
 Pecker

External links
 Outstanding Records home page

Alternative rock record labels
British record labels